Matin or MATIN may refer to:

Al-Matin, a name of God in Islam
Morning (dawn, early day, foreday) in medieval English

Places
Mount Matin, Antarctic Peninsula, Antarctica; a mountain
Stade du Matin, Colombes, France; a multipurpose stadium

People
Matin (surname)
Matin Karimzadeh (born 1998), Iranian soccer player
Matin Ahmed Khan, Pakistani academic

Other uses
MATIN, an Austrian political party 
RTL Matin, the Matin morning programme on the RTL radio network
Inter Matin, the Matin morning programme on the Inter radio network

See also

Le Matin (disambiguation)
Matins (disambiguation)
Matins, a morning prayer service